Frederick William Smith (October 29, 1871 – August 8, 1941) was a Canadian politician. He served in the Legislative Assembly of New Brunswick from 1921 to 1925 as member of the United Farmers. He died in 1941.

References 

1876 births
1941 deaths